Mickey's Rescue is a 1934 talkie short film in Larry Darmour's Mickey McGuire series starring a young Mickey Rooney. Directed by Jesse Duffy, the two-reel short was released to theaters on March 23, 1934, by Post Pictures Corp.

Plot
In order to give Billy a proper education, a rich couple decide to adopt Billy. Feeling that something bad might happen to him, Mickey and the Scorpions trail the wealthy couple to a hotel. There, Billy finds out that life as a rich kid isn't so hot. When Mickey and the gang finally find him, Billy has accidentally gone out of window, and is hanging high above the ground. Can Mickey and Hambone save Billy?

Cast
Order by credits:
Mickey Rooney - "Mickey McGuire"
Douglas Scott - "Stinkey Davis"
Billy Barty - Billy McGuire ("Mickey's Little Brother")
Marvin Stephens - "Katrink"
James Robinson - "Hambone Johnson"
Shirley Jeane Rickert - "Tomboy Taylor"
Spencer Bell -  Hotel Doorman (uncredited)
Hattie McDaniel - Maid (uncredited)
Robert McKenzie - Dental patient (uncredited)

cast notes
Last appearance of the character 'Stinkey Davis'.

References

External links 
 

1934 films
1934 comedy films
American black-and-white films
Mickey McGuire short film series
1934 short films
American comedy short films
1930s English-language films
1930s American films